Yesteryou, Yesterme, Yesterday (記得...香蕉成熟時) is a 1993 Hong Kong Cantonese comedy-drama film directed by Samson Chiu and starring Fung Bo Bo, Ellen Lo, Eric Tsang, John Tang and Roy Wong.

The film forms a trilogy with:
 Over the Rainbow, Under the Skirt (1994)
 Yesterday You, Yesterday Me (1997)

Cast
 Fung Bo Bo 
 Ellen Lo
 Eric Tsang
 John Tang
 Ann Bridgewater
 Roy Wong
 Michael Miu
 Barry Wong

External links 
 
 HK cinemagic entry
 loveHKfilm entry

1993 films
Hong Kong comedy-drama films
Films directed by Samson Chiu
1990s Hong Kong films